Parbold is a civil parish in the West Lancashire district of Lancashire, England.  It contains 15 buildings that are recorded in the National Heritage List for England as designated listed buildings.  Of these, two are at Grade II*, the middle grade, and the others are at Grade II, the lowest grade.  The parish contains the large village of Parbold and the surrounding countryside. The Leeds and Liverpool Canal passes through the parish and the listed buildings associated with this are four bridges, two milestones, and a lock.  The other listed buildings are houses, a farm building, a former windmill, a railway signal box, and two churches.


Key

Buildings

References

Citations

Sources

Lists of listed buildings in Lancashire
Buildings and structures in the Borough of West Lancashire